Zoom Schwartz Profigliano, also known as figliano, is a verbal "tag" drinking game with many variations.  One player at a time is active ("it").  The active player states a command from a predefined set of words, which typically include "zoom," "schwartz," and "profigliano."  The command shifts active status to another player, 'tagging' them.  Play continues until a player fouls by giving a command when not active, by failing to give a command promptly when active, or in some cases by giving a command which is prohibited by the current state of the game.  The game lends itself to bluffing where the active player uses nonverbal communication to suggest that someone else is active.  In a high-speed game a player might give a command passing active status to one player while looking at a different player, confusing the situation.

General overview
Figliano requires at least four players, with six to eight optimum.  The first player holds an imaginary ball. They pass it by looking at another player and stating one of the accepted calls.  The ball is given to the person defined by the word chosen. The ball is passed either to the person looked at or to another player that was previously ricocheted off of in the prior pass, depending upon the word used. During play, only passage words are allowed to be spoken.  
 
Figliano is often a drinking game where a player who fouls must take a drink.  In non-drinking forms the fouling player is simply embarrassed.  Either way, the fouling player starts the next round.  There is also a children's version where a break in the conversation eliminates the player. The games can have as few commands as the basic "Zoom", "Schwartz" and "Profigliano", but some variations have as many as fifteen commands. Play usually begins with two or three basic commands, then additional commands are added as the players become more proficient, increasing the difficulty factor.

Some variants also have motions which must be made along with the command.  Other versions describe the game as players passing around an imaginary ball of energy, a version also used as an improvisation game, where the object is to get the 'ball of energy' moving around the circle as fast as possible. Generally, however, it is accepted that all those participating in the game are friends, and when a player 'fouls' it is considered rude for fellow participants to literally 'point out' the player that fouled, opting instead to simply 'indicate' the fouler, by raising a bent arm, with the elbow aimed at the participant that committed the foul. A common expression explaining this courtesy is that 'friends don't point fingers, friends indicate'.

Calls

Zoom—This call is for passing the 'ball' to the person the caller looks at.  It is a foul to call zoom to a player already being engaged.

Schwartz—This call is for passing the 'ball' to the player that just passed the ball or the zoomer. It is a foul to look away when calling schwartz.

Figliano—A contracted version of Profigliano.  It is a no-look or look pass back to the person you are currently engaged with.

Strategy

Techniques to stimulate a mistake by another include: using all six words instead of only a few, constantly changing who the 'it' player is looking at, and varying the speed.

The game lends itself to coaxing a non-active player into speaking a command word by looking at them with the expectation of a response when speaking a command word or visualizing an expectation of a response from a non-active player who was looked at in the last pass.

The player starting the round must start by stating the name of the game (Zoom-Schwartz-Profigliano in this case) and must start with the first command (Zoom in this case).

Possible origins

The first play of the game may have been at Towson University in 1914.  Others say Zoom was brought to Ventura College in California in 1971 by Kelly Weaverling, a former Navy submariner who claimed the game originated by the Navy submarine crew he worked with.  Kelly taught the game to the technical students at Ventura College. 

Zoom Schwartz Figliano was actively played at Monclair State University in New Jersey by the Omega Phi Delta fraternity during the late '60s.  As a result, it migrated to the Burroughs Corporation's world headquarters Technical Information Organization (TIO/Conversion) in Detroit during the late '70s.   The ultimate rookie mistake was to Zoom a Zoomer.

Zoom Schwartz Profigliano was actively played at the University of California at Davis starting in 1976 and included the commands "Beefeater," which passed the "it" to the active player's left, and "Beutermann," which passed the "it" to the active player's right.  This was normally done with bluffing to further enhance the game.  Another variation utilized in the late 1980s at SUNY Morrisville coined the term “Coleman”. Alternately known as the CH29 rule, the studious player will sparingly employ this peppy bluffing tactic to pass the “it” to the player to their immediate left regardless of what direction they are looking.

Another version of the game was played at Northwestern University starting around late 1971. This version did not involve alcohol but rather LSD and other psychedelic drugs. Typically, only the three basic calls were used.  Rather than having participants drink after fouling, the objective was to infer deep meaning from the calls based on facial expressions, voice tones, body language, timing, and other cues. Thus, the game took on the nature of a conversation wherein emotions, as well as the volume of laughter, could run high.

A complex version of the game was present at Dartmouth College in the late '70s (when it was introduced is unknown), particularly at The Tabard and Alpha Theta, both coeducational Dartmouth College Greek Organizations.  In addition to 'zoom' and 'schwartz', calls included 'boint' (zoom with a headfake), 'mafigliano' (schwartz with a headfake), mergatroid (1 left), [?? 1 right], 'shripe' (2 left), 'dort' (2 right), 'beaver' (3 left), 'zunt' (3 right), and Mephistopheles (directly across).

Perhaps the most diabolical version of the game was played in the late 80s at SUNY University at Buffalo. The game began with the standard three calls (Zoom, Schwartz, Perfigliano), but then progressively added 5 others: Buteman, Coleman, Smith, Uncle Toby and Morowitz. Butaman gives "it" to the person to the right of the caller, without respect to whom the caller looks at. Coleman gives "it" to the person 2-to-the-left of the caller, again without respect to whom the caller looks at. Smith gives it back to the caller himself, making it possible to legally say Smith many times in succession. Uncle Toby must be called as an interrogative (e.g., Uncle Toby?). The person the caller is looking at must likewise answer with the interrogative "Yes?", and "it" passes 2 people to the right of the yes-man. The final call to be added is the dreaded Morowitz, which returns "it" to the person who was "it" 2 turns ago. Given that Morowitz is only added late in the game, and given the considerable degradation of memory concomitant with drinking games, Morowitz only enters the game when game play is nearing its natural end.

An equally challenging version was played at the Delta Phi chapter of the Alpha Chi Rho fraternity at Rensselaer Polytechnic University in the late 1970's and 1980's. Being "it" was referred to as "having The Zoom" or being the "Zoomer." Starting with the typical calls of Zoom (pass The Zoom to the person The Zoomer is looking at), Schwarz (return The Zoom to the previous Zoomer while looking at them), and Profigliano (return The Zoom to the previous Zoomer without looking at them), the call of Mordice moved The Zoom one person to The Zoomers left without eye contact. Mordice was usually not used at the start of the game but added during play. If a player needed to leave the game temporarily (e.g., to get more beer or to relieve themselves), they called "Zoom flapping out" and then "Zoom flapping in" when they returned to game play. Play continued with the remaining players in the meantime, who typically also introduced a new random call into the game with different mechanics, e.g., move The Zoom one person to The Zoomers right, two persons to the left, etc. It was up to the returning player to identify the mechanics of the new call by observation. Typical fouls (penalty drink) were Zooming the Zoomer, Nebulous Eyeballs (not looking directly at a person when calling Zoom), Epileptic Tongue (not pronouncing a call properly), and Delta T (for not continuing play immediately, usually due to not realizing one has The Zoom). Not only ZSP, but all drinking games at the chapter house used the "No Pointing" rule, so players used their elbows to call out a player for fouling.

See also 

Zip Zap Zop
Silent football
 List of drinking games

References

External links
 Game Description on BBC h2g2
 "The Rules of Sprodzoom" by Gareth Rees and Simon Arrowsmith
 "The Great Quux Poem Collection" by the Great Quux includes poems about the game written in January 1977.  This represents the earliest documented evidence of the game.
 The Official Rules for Zoom Schwartz Profigliano: Eshelman, Oshevsky, Groid, Hegeman, Comaneci, Nadia, Bozit, Boar, Obiwan, Ben Kenobe, Freznik, What/What, Lagnaf, Queeth and Kowalski  by Jon Melzer and Bruce Hackett

Drinking games
Party games